The Attorney General of South Carolina is the state's chief legal officer and prosecutor.

History 
Alexander Moultrie, half-brother of Revolutionary War figure and future governor William Moultrie, was named the state's first Attorney General under its first state "President", John Rutledge, in 1776. Rutledge had been provincial Attorney General himself for 10 months before independence.  Moultrie was impeached and resigned in 1792 for diverting state funds into the Yazoo land company fraud.

After the 1876 South Carolina gubernatorial election, the state was left with a contested election and a dual government, from the election in November through April 1877.  Republican Robert B. Elliott served briefly in this situation under Republican governor Daniel Henry Chamberlain, while James Conner held office under fellow Confederate officer and Democrat Wade Hampton III.  Hampton and Conner prevailed.

His Majesty's attorneys-general of South Carolina 

The colonial province of South Carolina was first organized under a royal governor in 1720.

  Benjamin Whitaker (1721–1731)
  James Abercrombie (1731–1732)
  Charles Pinckney (1732–1733)
  James Abercrombie (1733–1742)
  Sir James Wright (1742–1757)  
  David Graeme (1757–1764)
  James Moultrie (1764)
  John Rutledge (1764)
  Sir Egerton Leigh, 1st Baronet (1765–1774)
  James Simpson (1774–1775)

U.S. state of South Carolina Attorneys General

  Alexander Moultrie (1776–1792)
  John Julius Pringle (1792–1808)
  Langdon Cheves (1808–1810)
  John Smythe Richardson (Sr.) (1810–1818) 
  Robert Young Hayne (1818–1822) 
  James L. Petigru (1822–1830)
  Hugh S. Legaré (1830–1832)
  Robert Rhett (1832–1836) 
  Henry Bailey (1836–1848)
  Isaac W. Hayne (1848–1868)
 Daniel Henry Chamberlain (1868–1872)
  Samuel Wickliff Melton (1872–1876)
 William Stone (1876)
 Robert Brown Elliott (1876–1877) (disputed)
 James Conner (1876–1877) (disputed)
  Leroy Youmans (1877–1882)
  Charles R. Miles (1882–1886)
  Joseph H. Earle (1886–1890) 
  Young J. Pope (1890–1891)
  John L. McLaurin (1891–1892)
  Daniel A. Townsend (1892–1894)
  William A. Barber (1894–1898)
  G. Duncan Bellinger (Sr.) (1898–1902)
  U. X. Gunter, Jr. (1902–1905)
  Leroy Youmans (1905–1906)
  D.C. Ray (1906–1907)
  J. Fraser Lyon (1907–1912)
  Thomas H. Peeples (1913–1918)
  Samuel Wolfe (1918–1924)
  John M. Daniel (1924–1950)
  Tolliver Cleveland Callison Sr. (1951–1958)
  Daniel R. McLeod (1959–1983)
  Thomas T. Medlock (1983–1995)
  Charlie Condon (1995–2003) 
  Henry McMaster (2003–2011) 
  Alan Wilson (2011 – )

References